"My Perfect Cousin" is a song by Northern Irish punk rock band the Undertones. The song – inspired by an actual cousin of one of the band members – was written during the summer of 1979 and recorded at Wisseloord Studios in Hilversum in December 1979.

"My Perfect Cousin" was the first of two singles to be released from the band's Hypnotised LP (the second being "Wednesday Week"), and was released on 28 March 1980. The single reached number 9 in both the UK Singles Chart and Irish Singles Chart, making the song the band's only top 10 single.

"My Perfect Cousin" was voted number 30 in the 1980 NME singles of the year poll.

Background
The song was the sixth single released by the Undertones, and the first single to be written by Damian O'Neill and Michael Bradley. The music video to the song was largely filmed at the home of the O'Neill brothers, and was directed by Julien Temple. The song was performed on Top of the Pops on two occasions: 10 April and 24 April 1980.

Sleeve artwork
The artwork for the single sleeve depicts a Subbuteo figure in the colours of the band's local football club, Derry City. The lyrics to the song are printed on the rear cover of the sleeve.

Track listing

References

External links
 The Undertones official website

1979 songs
1980 singles
1980 songs
Music videos directed by Julien Temple
Sire Records singles
The Undertones songs
Works about cousins